Ruthless by Law is the second studio album by American hip hop group RBL Posse. It was released on November 15, 1994 via In-A-Minute Records. Recording sessions took place at Bayview Productions in Richmond, California. Production was handled by Cellski, The Enhancer, and RBL Posse, with Tony Jackson serving as executive producer. It features guest appearances from Cellski and Herm. The album peaked at number 197 on the Billboard 200, number 23 on the Top R&B/Hip-Hop Albums and number three on the Heatseekers Albums chart in the United States.

It is the last group's album featured member Mr. Cee as he was shot nine times and killed near his home on Harbor Road on New Year's Day 1996, as well as their final project for In-A-Minute Records label.

In 2014, it was placed at number 49 on Vibe magazine ’94 Week: The 50 Best Rap Albums Of 1994 list.

Track listing

Notes
 signifies a co-producer.

Personnel
Christopher "Black-C" Matthews – vocals, keyboards (tracks: 2, 4, 7, 9, 11-13), producer, mixing
Kyle "Mr. Cee" Church – vocals, keyboards (tracks: 5, 12, 14), producer, mixing
Ricky "Hitman" Herd – vocals (tracks: 5, 7, 11)
Marcel "Cellski" Wade – vocals (tracks: 1, 7), keyboards & producer (tracks: 1, 6, 8), co-producer (track 10)
Andre "Herm" Lewis – vocals (track 15)
Don "The Enhancer" Marsh – keyboards (tracks: 1-5, 7, 9, 11-15), producer (tracks: 8, 15), co-producer (track 2), mixing
Dravail – backing vocals (tracks: 4, 11, 13)
Andre "Baba" Mathews – backing vocals (track 11)
Audrey Jones – backing vocals (track 11)
Tomie "T.C." Witherspoon – mixing
Ken Lee – mastering
Tony Jackson – executive producer
Victor Hall – photography, layout

Charts

References

External links

1994 albums
RBL Posse albums